Glorious Days is a Hong Kong based Thoroughbred racehorse. In the season of 2013–2014, he won the Hong Kong Mile. It is his first international group one win.

2007 racehorse births
Racehorses bred in Australia
Racehorses trained in New Zealand
Racehorses trained in Hong Kong
Hong Kong racehorses
Thoroughbred family 4-b